This is the discography of Sublime, an American ska punk band formed in Long Beach, California that consisted of Bradley Nowell (vocals and guitar), Bud Gaugh (drums) and Eric Wilson (bass guitar). Over the band's eight-year career, they released three studio albums, as well as a live album, five compilation albums, three EPs, one box set, five official singles and four tribute albums. In total, the band sold 14.9 million albums in the United States. The band disbanded after singer Bradley Nowell's death in 1996.

Albums

Studio albums

Live albums

Compilation albums

EPs

Singles

References

Sublime
Discographies of American artists